The 111th Grey Cup will be played to decide the Canadian Football League (CFL) championship for the 2024 season. The game is scheduled to be played at BC Place Stadium in Vancouver, British Columbia. It will be the 17th time that Vancouver has hosted the Grey Cup, with the most recent being in 2014. The game will be televised in Canada nationally on TSN and RDS.

Host
On November 3, 2022, it was announced that the game had been awarded to the city of Vancouver and the host BC Lions. The Winnipeg Blue Bombers were reportedly also bidding to host this game, but also submitted a bid for the 112th Grey Cup game.

Date
The date of this game was not announced, but if existing scheduling formulas are used, then this game would be played on November 17, 2024 (the third Sunday of November). However, as per the latest Collective Bargaining Agreement, the league has the option of moving the start of the season up to 30 days, which could significantly alter the date of this game.

References 

Grey Cup
Grey Cups hosted in Vancouver
Grey Cup
Grey Cup
Grey
2024 in Canadian television
2024 in British Columbia